"One Hundred and Two" is a song written by Wynonna Judd, Paul Kennerley and Don Potter, and recorded by American country music duo The Judds.  It was released in April 1991 as was the third single from the album Love Can Build a Bridge.  The song reached number 6 on the Billboard Hot Country Singles & Tracks chart.

Chart performance
"One Hundred and Two" debuted on the U.S. Billboard Hot Country Singles & Tracks for the week of April 13, 1991.

Year-end charts

References

1991 singles
1990 songs
The Judds songs
Songs written by Paul Kennerley
RCA Records singles
Curb Records singles
Songs written by Wynonna Judd
Song recordings produced by Brent Maher